Beswan (also known as Vishwamitra Puri) is a town and a nagar panchayat in Aligarh district in the state of Uttar Pradesh, India. Beswan was a jagir which was ruled by Thenua Jats.

Geography
It has an average elevation of 176 metres (577 feet).

Demographics
 India census, Beswan had a population of 9,120. Males constitute 58% of the population and females 42%. Beswan has an average literacy rate of 87%, higher than the national average of 59.5%; with 65% of the males and 35% of females literate. 20% of the population is under 6 years of age.

Tourist places
 Dharnidhar Pond is famous place of Beswan where Vishwamitra did worship.
 Maa Putha Vali, Barhdwari Prabhu Bhole nath ji & Ram Mandir is also famous in small town.
@ This is second position town in Uttar Pradesh (State).
Many fairs are also organised at various times of festivals

Education
Mangalayatan University

Nearby cities
Aligarh, Iglas, Mathura, Hathras, Raya

Nearby Villages & Town
Kalinjari, Gorai, Amarpur dhana, Shyam Garhi, Sudama ka bas

References

Cities and towns in Aligarh district